The Henrico Theatre is an Art Deco-style building in Henrico County, Virginia that was built in 1938.  It was listed on the National Register of Historic Places in 2005.

References

Theatres on the National Register of Historic Places in Virginia
Theatres completed in 1938
Buildings and structures in Henrico County, Virginia
Art Deco architecture in Virginia
National Register of Historic Places in Henrico County, Virginia
1938 establishments in Virginia